Robert Moore (March 30, 1778 – January 14, 1831) was a member of the U.S. House of Representatives from Pennsylvania.

Robert Moore (grandfather of Michael Daniel Harter) was born on a farm near Washington, Pennsylvania.  He attended Washington (now Washington & Jefferson) College in Washington, Pennsylvania.  He studied law, was admitted to the bar in 1802 and commenced practice in Beaver, Pennsylvania.  He served as treasurer of Beaver County, Pennsylvania from 1805 to 1811.  He served in the Pennsylvania State Militia in the War of 1812.

Moore was elected as a Republican to the Fifteenth and Sixteenth Congresses.  He was not a candidate for renomination. He was elected a member of the American Antiquarian Society in 1820.  He resumed the practice of law and was a member of the Pennsylvania House of Representatives in 1830 and 1831.  He died in Beaver in 1831 and was interred in Beaver Cemetery located within the town of Beaver.

References

Sources

The Political Graveyard

1778 births
1831 deaths
Members of the Pennsylvania House of Representatives
People from Pennsylvania in the War of 1812
Washington & Jefferson College alumni
Pennsylvania lawyers
Politicians from Pittsburgh
Democratic-Republican Party members of the United States House of Representatives from Pennsylvania
Members of the American Antiquarian Society
19th-century American lawyers